Miss Grand Venezuela is a Venezuelan female beauty pageant that has been held for the first time in 2022 to select the country's representatives to compete in its parent stage Miss Grand International, in which Venezuela acquired the main title once in 2019, won by a 19-year-old model from Anzoátegui, Valentina Figuera.

Venezuela's representatives always got placement at Miss Grand International, except for 2020, however, during 2013 - 2021, all such representatives were appointed instead of organizing the Miss Grand national contest. The first edition of Miss Grand Venezuela was held in August 2022 in Caracas.

The reigning Miss Grand Venezuela is Luiseth Materán of Miranda who was appointed to represent the country at Miss Grand International 2022 in Indonesia, where she was placed 3rd Runner Up finalists.

Background

History
Venezuela has been participating in the Miss Grand International since its establishment in 2013. Throughout 2013 – 2016, under the leadership of a Venezuelan marketing publicist Bruno Caldieron, either winners or runners-up of the "Señorita Deporte Venezuela" pageant were designated as Miss Grand Venezuela. Thenceforward, the license of Miss Grand Venezuela was respectively transferred to Miguel Segovia, Osmel Sousa, and George Wittles in 2017, 2019, and 2020. However, the country representatives during such periods were all appointed; no respective national pageant was held to elect the titleholders. Until 2021, the inaugural edition of Miss Grand Venezuela was expected to be held under the leadership of George Wittles but postponed to 2022 due to the COVID-19 pandemic, the country's representative was instead appointed.

After the aforementioned urgent postponement, the inaugural edition of the national contest "Miss Grand Venezuela" finally took place in Caracas in July 2022, the winner of such becomes the first Miss Grand Venezuela titleholder to be elected through the Miss Grand national pageant.

Date and location

Selection of contestants
In the first edition of Miss Grand Venezuela, the national aspirants were determined either by the state licensee or the national organizer through their regional contests or casting events, in which some state pageants were permitted to select more than one qualified winner, such as Miss Grand Los Andes held in San Cristóbal, where the representatives of Táchira, Barinas, Mérida, and Trujillo, were determined.

Titleholders

Designated representatives; 2013 – 2022

Miss Grand Venezuela pageant; 2023 – present

Titleholder gallery

National finalists
The following list is the national finalists of the Miss Grand Venezuela pageant, as well as the competition results.

Color keys
 Declared as the winner
 Ended as a runner-up (Top 5)
 Ended as a semifinalist (Top 12)
 Ended as a semifinalist (Top 16)
 Did not participate
 Withdraw during the competition

See also
 Miss Venezuela

References

Grand Venezuela
Recurring events established in 2022
Venezuelan awards
Venezuela